Zippy is the female mascot of the University of Akron athletics team.  Zippy is a kangaroo, and was chosen by a committee in 1953.

The school's nickname, "Zips", is a shortening of "Zippers", a pair of rubber overshoes and a brand name of the BF Goodrich Company of Akron.  It was originally adopted by the school in 1925 after a contest to give the school a nickname. In 1950, the current nickname "Zippy" was adopted (perhaps because of the rising popularity of zippers in use on pants). Two years later, a committee suggested the kangaroo as a mascot ("Kangaroos" was one of the choices in 1925), and it was accepted by the student council on May 1, 1953.  Originally, it was met with derision, as it was not put to a campus-wide vote.  However, over time, Zippy has become a fan favorite at the school.

"Zippy" has always been a costumed mascot, and currently wears a blue letter-sweater and a gold-and-blue rat cap.

In 2007 Zippy was chosen as one of twelve collegiate mascots to compete for Capital One Bowl mascot of the year. With an unprecedented 13–0 record, Zippy was named the winner on January 1, 2008.

References

Mid-American Conference mascots
Akron Zips
Fictional kangaroos and wallabies
1953 establishments in Ohio